Tazin Lake is a lake in the Canadian province of Saskatchewan.

See also
List of lakes of Saskatchewan

References 

Lakes of Saskatchewan